The Cadiz Township Joint District No. 2 School building is located in Browntown, Wisconsin.

History
The building was added to the State Register of Historic Places in 1995 and to the National Register of Historic Places the following year. It currently serves as a private residence.

References

School buildings on the National Register of Historic Places in Wisconsin
Residential buildings on the National Register of Historic Places in Wisconsin
National Register of Historic Places in Green County, Wisconsin
Schools in Green County, Wisconsin
Defunct schools in Wisconsin
Bungalow architecture in Wisconsin
School buildings completed in 1921
1921 establishments in Wisconsin